Shinobu Asagoe and Ai Sugiyama were the defending champions. They were both present but did not compete together.
Asagoe partnered with Tathiana Garbin, but lost in the semifinals to Conchita Martínez and Virginia Ruano Pascual.
Sugiyama partnered with Daniela Hantuchová, but lost in the semifinals to Anna-Lena Grönefeld and Martina Navratilova.

Anna-Lena Grönefeld and Martina Navratilova won in the final 5–7, 6–3, 6–4, against Conchita Martínez and Virginia Ruano Pascual.

Seeds
The top four seeds received a bye into the second round.

Draw

Finals

Top half

Bottom half

External links
Draw and Qualifying Draw

Cup - Doubles